Joni Korhonen (born 8 February 1987) is a Finnish football player who currently plays for the Ykkönen side PK-35 in Finland.

Career

Club career
In December 2018, it was confirmed that Korhonen had joined AC Oulu, the club he played for in 2009. He made 31 appearances for the team before leaving at the end of 2019, after signing with PK-35 Vantaa for the 2020 season.

References

External links
 

1987 births
Living people
Finnish footballers
Finnish expatriate footballers
Veikkausliiga players
Klubi 04 players
FC Viikingit players
FC Espoo players
FC Honka players
Kyrkslätt Idrottsförening players
Bonner SC players
AC Oulu players
PK-35 Vantaa (men) players
HIFK Fotboll players
Ykkönen players
Kakkonen players
Association football wingers
Finnish expatriate sportspeople in Germany
Expatriate footballers in Germany
Footballers from Espoo